Khana Qubadi (1700–1759) was a Kurdish poet from the Jaff tribe who wrote in Gorani. He belonged to the Hawrami school of poetry in the Ardalan principality and lived in Derne which was the capital of Derteng, Hulwan and Bajelan dynasties which is located in modern-day Salas-e Babajani County. He first lived in Ardalan, but had to flee to neighboring Baban because of his translations of the Quran to Gorani.

Works
His main published work is Şîrîn û Xesrew  (Shirin and Khasraw), written in 1740. Despite being a master in Persian and Persian literature, he was in favor of using Kurdish as indicated in one of his poems:

References

1700 births
1759 deaths
Kurdish-language poets
Kurdish poets
Kurdish scholars
Kurdish philosophers